The Charlotte Edwards Cup, initially named the Women's Regional T20, is an English women's cricket Twenty20 domestic competition organised by the England and Wales Cricket Board. The first edition of the tournament took place in 2021. The tournament is named after England's former captain and most capped player, Charlotte Edwards.

The tournament features eight teams, representing regional hubs across England and Wales. The tournament is a successor to the Women's Cricket Super League, which ended in 2019. Whilst a regional T20 tournament was planned for 2020, it was cancelled in favour of the 50-over Rachael Heyhoe Flint Trophy in the shortened 2020 season due to the COVID-19 pandemic. The tournament now runs alongside the Rachael Heyhoe Flint Trophy and The Hundred.

History
With the ending of the Women's Cricket Super League in 2019, the England and Wales Cricket Board intended to launch a new regional structure for domestic women's cricket in England and Wales, including a 50-over competition, a Twenty20 competition and The Hundred. However, as the COVID-19 pandemic shortened the 2020 season, only the 50-over Rachael Heyhoe Flint Trophy was able to go ahead that season, with six new teams competing, plus Western Storm and Southern Vipers carried over from the WCSL, representing regional hubs. 

In 2021, with a return to a full schedule, it was announced in February that the new Twenty20 competition would be called the Women's Regional T20, to run alongside the Rachael Heyhoe Flint Trophy and to be competed for by the same teams. Two days before the tournament began, it was renamed the Charlotte Edwards Cup, with the first edition of the tournament getting underway on 26 June, eventually being won by South East Stars. The second edition of the tournament was won by Southern Vipers, who beat Central Sparks in the final.

Teams

The teams for the Charlotte Edwards Cup are as follows:

Competition format
In 2021 and 2022, teams played each other home and away in their group. The two group winners and the best second-place team advanced to Finals Day. The best group winner advanced straight to the final, whilst the other two teams played off in a semi-final. From 2023, teams will play in one group of eight, playing each other team in their group once, with the top team in the group advancing directly to the final, whilst the second and third-placed teams play off in the semi-final.

Teams receive 4 points for a win. A bonus point is given where the winning team's run rate is 1.25 or greater times that of the opposition. In case of a tie in the standings, the following tiebreakers are applied in order: highest net run rate, team that scored the most points in matches involving the tied parties, better bowling strike rate, drawing of lots.

Tournament results

References

 
Women's cricket competitions in England
English domestic cricket competitions
2021 establishments in England
Women's sports leagues in England
Sports leagues established in 2021